The following is a list of football stadiums in Colombia, ordered by capacity. The listed stadiums are or were used in at least a season by a professional team. The largest stadiums in Colombia which are not used for football are the 14,500-capacity Santamaría Bullring in Bogotá and the Estadio Édgar Rentería, a 12,000-capacity baseball stadium in Barranquilla.

References

See also
List of South American stadiums by capacity

Colombia
Football stadiums
Football stadiums